Otbert (Latin Otbertus, Italian Oberto; died after 1014) was Margrave of Milan. A member of the Obertenghi family, he succeeded his father, Otbert I, as margrave after his father's death in 975, together with his brother Adalbert. He was also count of Milan, Genoa, and Bobbio. In 1002, he joined Arduin's revolt against Henry II, Holy Roman Emperor.

Family
Otbert had the following children with Railenda, daughter of Count Riprand, and widow of Sigfred, Count of Seprio:
 Hugh, Margrave of Milan
 Albert Azzo I, Margrave of Milan
 Bertha, married Manfred II, Margrave of Turin, she has by some also been identified as the wife of Arduin, Margrave of Ivrea
 Adalbert IV
 Guido
 Otbert III, Margrave of East Liguria

10th-century births
11th-century deaths
Year of birth uncertain
Year of death uncertain